The Sir John Sulman Medal is an architectural prize presented by the New South Wales chapter of the Australian Institute of Architects since 1932. The medal is sometimes referred to as the Sulman Award and now recognises excellence in public and commercial buildings in either New South Wales or in the Australian Capital Territory. Before the advent of the Wilkinson Award it was on occasions presented to domestic projects.

The medal is presented in memory of the Australian architect Sir John Sulman (29 August 1849 – 18 August 1934). Sulman was born in Greenwich, England, and emigrated to Sydney in 1885. From 1921 to 1924 he was chairman of the Federal Capital Advisory Committee and influenced the development of Canberra.

Winners

See also

Architecture of Australia
Buildings and structures awarded the Sir John Sulman Medal
Recipients of the Royal Australian Institute of Architects’ Gold Medal

References

Further reading
 
 Metcalf, Andrew (1977). Architecture in Transition: The Sulman Award 1932-1997. Sydney: Historic Houses Trust of NSW.

Architecture awards
1932 establishments in Australia
Awards established in 1932
Australian awards